is the second studio album by Japanese singer Aiko, released on March 1, 2000. It reached #1 in the Japanese charts, and had several hit singles. The music on it is a fusion of jazz, rock and j-pop.

Track listing

References

2000 albums
Pony Canyon albums
Aiko (singer) albums